Pavlos Mamalos (born February 8, 1971) is a Greek paralympic athlete in powerlifting, a Paralympic gold medalist and World Championships silver medalist.

Mamalos has participated in four consecutive Summer Paralympics. He was first in the Rio de Janeiro 2016 Paralympics in Men's 107 kg, silver medalist in the 2008 Paralympics in Men's 82.5 kg and bronze medalist in the 2012 Summer Paralympics in Men's 90 kg. In his first Paralympic Games (Athens, 2004) he took the sixth place in Men's 90 kg.

See also 
 Greece at the 2016 Summer Paralympics

References 

Panathinaikos players with disabilities
Paralympic powerlifters of Greece
Paralympic gold medalists for Greece
Paralympic silver medalists for Greece
Paralympic bronze medalists for Greece
1971 births
Living people
Medalists at the 2008 Summer Paralympics
Medalists at the 2012 Summer Paralympics
Medalists at the 2016 Summer Paralympics
Paralympic medalists in powerlifting
Powerlifters at the 2008 Summer Paralympics
Powerlifters at the 2012 Summer Paralympics
Powerlifters at the 2016 Summer Paralympics
People from Aspropyrgos
Sportspeople from Attica